The Bank of British North America was founded by Royal Charter issued in 1836 in London, England. British North America was the common name by which the British colonies and territories that now comprise Canada were known prior to 1867. The bank had offices in Toronto, Upper Canada; Montreal and Quebec City, Lower Canada; Saint John, New Brunswick; Halifax, Nova Scotia; and St. John's, Newfoundland. 

It was the first bank operating in British Columbia.   It also operated agencies in New York City and San Francisco.

Like the other Canadian chartered banks, it issued its own bank notes,  1852 to 1911. The end dates are the final dates appearing on notes, which may have circulated for some time after. The Bank of Canada was established through the Bank of Canada Act of 1934 and the banks relinquished their right to issue their own currency.

The Bank of British North America merged with the Bank of Montreal in 1918.

Branches
The Bank of British North America in Dawson, Yukon built in 1899 is on the Registry of Historical Places of Canada. The Bank of British North America in Winnipeg, Manitoba, constructed in 1903-04, is on the Registry of Historical Places of Canada.

49 Yonge Street, Toronto

The first Toronto branch, designed by John George Howard was built in 1845, with exterior work by John Cochrane and Brothers, at the northeast corner of Yonge Street and Wellington. The current building, designed by architect Henry Langley, replaced the original in 1875. A restaurant occupies the ground floor with offices above.

276 Duckworth Street, St. John's

The former Bank of British North America in  St. John's, Newfoundland built in 1849 is on the Registry of Historical Places of Canada.
This bank building was constructed in 1849, after the St. John's fire of 1846, by Halifax architect David Stirling.

1211 King Street West, Toronto

The former branch constructed in 1906-07 at the southwest corner of King Street West and Dufferin Street in the Parkdale area of Toronto continued to operate as a branch of the Bank of Montreal until its closure in 2018.

Gallery

References

Further reading
 Denison, Merrill, 1893–1975. Canada's first bank : a history of the Bank of Montreal. Toronto: McClelland and Stewart, c1966. 2 v. : ill., maps, ports., (some folded, some col). ; 25 cm.

See also

 Bank of British North America Building
 Bank of Montreal
 Canadian chartered bank notes

Defunct banks of Canada
Bank of Montreal
Banks established in 1835
1835 establishments in Canada
Banks disestablished in 1918
1918 disestablishments in Canada
City of Toronto Heritage Properties
1918 mergers and acquisitions
Defunct companies of Newfoundland and Labrador